The Secret Migration is the sixth album by the alternative rock band Mercury Rev, released on January 24, 2005 in the UK (and a day later in the US).  A limited edition of the American release of the album featured special packaging and included a bonus disc featuring b-sides, rarities, and live tracks.

Reception

The Secret Migration received mixed reviews from the majority of critics.

Track listing
All songs written by Mercury Rev.

"Secret for a Song" – 4:01
"Across Yer Ocean" – 3:20
"Diamonds" – 3:51
"Black Forest (Lorelei)" – 4:46
"Vermillion" – 4:07
"In the Wilderness" – 2:32
"In a Funny Way" – 4:02
"My Love" – 4:14
"Moving On" – 1:20
"The Climbing Rose" – 3:19
"Arise" – 3:49
"First-Time Mother's Joy (Flying)" – 3:31
"Down Poured the Heavens" – 1:36

American limited edition bonus disc
"The Black Swan" – 4:13
"My Love" (Live) – 4:04
"Afraid" – 3:42
"Black Forest (Lorelei)" (Live) – 4:44
"Observatory Crest" – 3:45
"Streets of Laredo" – 2:43
"Diamonds" (Live) – 3:29
"Mirror for a Bell" – 3:11

Personnel
 Jonathan Donahue
 Grasshopper (Sean Mackowiak)
 Jeff Mercel
 Dave Fridmann
 Carlos Anthony Molina

Charts

References

Mercury Rev albums
2005 albums
Albums produced by Dave Fridmann
Albums recorded at Tarbox Road Studios